The Ends of the Earth is a collection of science fiction and horror stories by American writer Lucius Shepard. It was released in 1991 and was the author's second book published by Arkham House. It was published in an edition of 4,655 copies.  The stories originally appeared in Isaac Asimov's Science Fiction Magazine, The Magazine of Fantasy and Science Fiction and other magazines.

Contents
The Ends of the Earth contains the following stories:
"The Ends of the Earth"
 "Delta Sly Honey"
 "Bound for Glory"
 "The Exercise of Faith"
 "Nomans Land"
 "Life of Buddha"
 "Shades"
 "Aymara"
 "A Wooden Tiger"
 "The Black Clay Boy"
 "Fire Zone Emerald"
 "On the Border"
 "The Scalehunter's Beautiful Daughter"
 "Surrender"

Awards
World Fantasy Award - 1992

Sources

1991 short story collections
English-language books
Short story collections by Lucius Shepard
Horror short story collections
World Fantasy Award-winning works
Arkham House books